The Situation Room with Wolf Blitzer (also simply The Situation Room) is a daily newscast on CNN hosted by Wolf Blitzer that first aired on August 8, 2005.

The show currently airs weekdays live from 6:00p.m. to 7:00pm ET from CNN's studios in Washington, D.C.

A Saturday edition, recapping the news of the week, was formerly produced from 2008 to 2013. It was cancelled as Blitzer would anchor the 1PM hour of CNN Newsroom.

Format

Outside of special editions, the show begins with the following opening: Happening Now ..... We want to welcome our viewers in the United States and around the world. I'm Wolf Blitzer/(insert name (used on guest hosted episodes when Blitzer is off tonight)) (Wolf Blitzer is off for the night,), (and) You're in the Situation Room" Following the opening, the show sometimes begins with breaking news. During the program current events, breaking news, political headlines and reports are all discussed.

The show also makes use of CNN journalists from across the network and political analysts. They include Abby Phillip, Laura Coates, Doug Jones, Dana Bash, Bakari Sellers, John Kasich, Ana Navarro, Miles Taylor, Jamie Gangel, John Harwood (journalist), Gloria Borger, and John King.

By 2012, CNN's Washington D.C. studios were completely redesigned giving The Situation Room a newly updated look.

Former Situation Room main contributors include Lisa Sylvester who showcased reports and headlines, Jack Cafferty who presented The Cafferty File, and Kate Bolduan who briefly co-hosted part of the program with Wolf Blitzer.

2021 Time shift 
In January 2021, CNN announced that the show would shift from two hours to one hour, airing from 6 p.m. to 7 p.m. ET on weekdays from April 2021. The Lead with Jake Tapper will take over the former first hour of the show.

References

External links

2005 American television series debuts
CNN original programming
2000s American television news shows
2010s American television news shows